Shazar may refer to:

Shazar, Iran, a village in Qazvin Province, Iran
Pal Shazar, American singer and songwriter
Rachel Katznelson-Shazar (1885-1975), wife of Zalman Shazar
Zalman Shazar (1889-1974), Israeli politician, author, and poet (3rd President of Israel)